Davina is a British chat show hosted by Davina McCall. It first aired on BBC One on 15 February 2006, however, the show ended on 12 April 2006 at the end of its first series due to low ratings.

The series was announced in December 2005. One show attracted fewer than 2.3 million viewers, when it was moved to 7pm. The series received a poor critical reception, with Gareth Maclean saying that McCall "... found herself floundering and foundering, struggling through "interviews" with stars of the calibre of Girls Aloud, Westlife and Patrick Kielty...", and "... demonstrated a complete lack of talent as a chatshow host", with McCall herself saying that the programme was "the worst mistake of her life".

Guests
The guests for the series were:

Ratings
This is a table displaying the averages of each show for the chatshow, which aired on BBC1. These figures are made available from MediaGuardian.

References

External links
 
Davina McCall Unofficial Fansite

2006 British television series debuts
2006 British television series endings
2000s British television talk shows
BBC Television shows
BBC television talk shows